Peklayb is a rural locality (a village) in Chazyovskoye Rural Settlement, Kosinsky District, Perm Krai, Russia. The population was 14 as of 2010. There are 3 streets.

Geography 
Peklayb is located 37 km west of Kosa (the district's administrative centre) by road. Karchey is the nearest rural locality.

References 

Rural localities in Kosinsky District